Master Teague III (born May 19, 2000) is an American football running back for the Pittsburgh Steelers of the National Football League (NFL). He played college football at Ohio State, and high school football at Blackman High School in Murfreesboro, Tennessee.

High school career
Playing at Blackman High School, Teague committed to Ohio State on June 11, 2017, when he released a video on Twitter.  Teague chose the Buckeyes over South Carolina, Georgia and Auburn, among others.  Coming out of high school Teague was a four-star prospect by 247Sports.com and Rivals.com. He was rated as the No. 8 running back by Rivals and No. 11 by 247Sports.

College career
Teague enrolled at Ohio State University in January 2018, so that he could participate in Spring practice.  Teague was behind J. K. Dobbins and Mike Weber in the depth chart. Though he was deep in the running back rotation, he did see the field in four games where he totaled 106 yards on 17 carries, and scoring on one 33-yard touchdown run against Oregon State.

Following a change in NCAA rules, Teague was able to earn a Redshirt for his true-Freshman year. Going into 2019, Teague battled for the back-up spot on the Buckeye roster behind Dobbins. He quickly earned the role and averaged 11 carries and 69 yards per game and also scoring three touchdowns through the first half of the season. He finished the year with 135 carries for 789 rushing yards and four rushing touchdowns. In the COVID-19 pandemic-shortened season in 2020, Teague had 104 carries for 514 rushing yards and eight rushing touchdowns in seven games. In the 2021 season, Teague appeared in seven games and had 67 carries for 355 rushing yards and four rushing touchdowns.

Statistics
Through 2021, Teague's statistics are as follows:

Professional career

Chicago Bears
Teague signed with the Chicago Bears as an undrafted free agent on May 6, 2022, but was waived three days later.

Pittsburgh Steelers
On August 3, 2022, Teague signed with the Pittsburgh Steelers. He was waived/injured on August 18 and placed on injured reserve. He was released on August 24. He was re-signed to the practice squad on November 23, 2022. He was released on December 7. He signed a reserve/future contract on January 10, 2023.

References

External links
Pittsburgh Steelers bio
Ohio State Buckeyes bio

2000 births
Living people
Players of American football from Tennessee
American football running backs
Ohio State Buckeyes football players
People from Murfreesboro, Tennessee
Chicago Bears players
Pittsburgh Steelers players